The Symphony No. 2 by William Walton was written between 1957 and 1960, and premiered in September 1960. It received a mixed reception at first: some critics thought Walton's music old-fashioned. Subsequently it has been re-evaluated and praised. The work was first performed by the Royal Liverpool Philharmonic Orchestra, conducted by John Pritchard and was first recorded by the Cleveland Orchestra, conducted by George Szell. It has subsequently been recorded by conductors from Britain, the US and elsewhere.

Background and first performances
Walton's First Symphony, described by one critic as "an emotional blockbuster", performed in full for the first time in 1935, was one of the works that had marked him out as a leading British composer. By the 1950s his music remained popular with the public but was regarded by many critics as old-fashioned. The commission for a second symphony came in 1956, when the Liverpool Philharmonic Society invited him to compose the work to mark the 750th anniversary, the following year, of the granting of the first charter of incorporation to Liverpool, by King John.

Walton could not begin work on the piece immediately, being occupied with writing his Cello Concerto for Gregor Piatigorsky. A slow worker, Walton missed the deadline for the 1957 anniversary celebrations, and it was not until November of that year that he found "glimmerings of the Symph are beginning to stir slightly". It was not until January 1959 that he completed the first movement; the middle, slow movement was written during January and February 1960 and the finale was completed in July. The city of Liverpool authorities agreed that as the work was finished too late for the anniversary it could be premiered at the Edinburgh Festival, provided the Royal Liverpool Philharmonic Orchestra played it there. The orchestra's chief conductor, John Pritchard, conducted the premiere at the Usher Hall, Edinburgh on 2 September 1960. The same forces gave the London premiere at a Royal Philharmonic Society concert at the Royal Festival Hall on 23 November 1960.

George Szell and the Concertgebouw Orchestra gave the European continental premiere in Amsterdam on 19 November 1960. Szell conducted the American premiere of the work on 29 December 1960 with the Cleveland Orchestra at Severance Hall, Cleveland, and the New York premiere in February 1961. A few months later Szell and the Cleveland Orchestra made the first recording. Walton dedicated the work to the Clevelanders and later also to the memory of Szell. Leopold Stokowski gave the work another early continental performance in Vienna in May 1961 while on tour with the London Symphony Orchestra.

Structure

The work is in three movements, with a total playing time of just under half an hour. It is scored for a large symphony orchestra comprising three flutes (third doubling piccolo), three oboes (third doubling cor anglais), three clarinets (second doubling clarinet in E-flat, third doubling bass clarinet), three bassoons (third doubling contrabassoon), four horns, three trumpets, three trombones, tuba, timpani, military drum, snare drum, crash cymbals, suspended cymbal, bass drum, glockenspiel, vibraphone, xylophone, tambourine, bell, piano, celesta, two harps and strings.

First movement
The movement is broadly in traditional sonata form, opening with a brisk theme played over a background of strings and celesta in G minor. A bridge passage leads to the second subject, a gentler, grazioso theme, followed by an agitato passage described by the critic Frank Howes as "noisy with glissandi, percussion, brass, and short snaps and stutters on the strings". A development section leads to a recapitulation in which the first subject is compressed to the half the length of its original form and the second subject is extended to be slightly longer than at its first appearance. The coda begins quietly with a horn solo, the opening motif is repeated and the movement ends quietly with what Howes calls an acidulated G minor chord.

Slow movement
Walton's biographer Neil Tierney describes it as appearing to be "an almost continuous, unbroken web of sumptuous cantilena writing", although it comprises a succession of themes, each growing out of its predecessor. The movement ends in harmonic ambiguity, hovering between B major and B minor.

Finale
The third movement is marked Passacaglia: Theme, Variations, Fugato, and Coda-Scherzando. The theme, played by the unison full orchestra, is followed by ten variations, mostly short, of various moods, a fugue based on the main theme, and a final scherzando by way of coda, leading to an emphatic conclusion with repeated chords of G major.

Critical reception
As Walton had predicted, after the mixed reception of the Cello Concerto, the section of the musical press that favoured avant-garde works responded tepidly to the Symphony, finding it "the mixture as before" and "marking time" Peter Heyworth in The Observer praised some aspects of the symphony – "there leaps from almost every bar an intense sense of character, compounded of that odd assortment of jauntiness, irony and an underlying melancholy" – but felt that the work did not represent any real progress from Walton's earlier music.

Howes wrote in The Times after the premiere that the Symphony was something by which to remember an otherwise unmemorable Edinburgh Festival:

Kennedy wrote in 1989 that it was easy to understand how and why the Symphony was underestimated on its first appearance: "Everyone was expecting another emotional blockbuster like the First. Instead they heard a lighter, much shorter, three-movement work that might have been more suitably called a Sinfonietta". Kennedy compares Walton and Elgar as symphonists: both wrote two symphonies, but Elgar's "were built to a similar scale and emotional groundplan. Walton’s are not and to compare one with the other is a pointless exercise". Both Howes and Kennedy write that it takes several hearings to understand the Symphony and to grasp its full meaning and its beauties.

In Grove's Dictionary of Music and Musicians (2001), Byron Adams rates the Second Symphony as one of Walton's finest works, more refined than the First Symphony: "it is remarkable for its stylistic integration, developmental ingenuity and orchestral mastery. Although not as urgently passionate as its predecessor, the Second Symphony is notated with greater clarity and displays clearer formal articulation". In a 2002 study Robert Matthew-Walker calls the Second "this magnificent Symphony", remarking on the music's "sense of flight, in the vivid Mediterranean-like chiaroscuro colouring and in the virtuosic scoring for woodwind and high strings [which] seems to defy musical gravity". Matthew-Walker comments that the Symphony achieves the "emotional and spiritual continuity" Walton sought, uniting underlying tonality with "the foreground features of serial thematicism".

Recordings

Source; William Walton Trust.

References

Sources
 
 
 
 
 

Symphony 2
Walton, William 2
1960 compositions
Music commissioned by the Royal Liverpool Philharmonic